Maran van Erp (born 3 December 1990) is a Dutch footballer who plays for PSV/FC Eindhoven on the BeNe League and for Netherlands.

Club career
In the summer of 2009, Van Erp left amateur association RKVVO to play with Willem II in the Eredivisie. After two years playing for the Tricolores she moved to VVV-Venlo. After a year she returned to Brabant, to play for PSV/FC Eindhoven in the newly formed BeNe League.

International career
On May 20, 2015 Van Erp debuted for the Netherlands in a friendly against Estonia (7-0). In the 62nd minute, she replaced another debutant, Marthe Munsterman. In 2015, she was among the 23-roster who was called to represent Netherlands in the 2015 FIFA Women's World Cup.

References

External links

 Twitter profile

Living people
1990 births
Dutch women's footballers
Netherlands women's international footballers
Women's association football defenders
2015 FIFA Women's World Cup players
People from Veldhoven
Eredivisie (women) players
PSV (women) players
Willem II (women) players
VVV-Venlo (women) players
Footballers from North Brabant